As with most ancient Egyptian royal dynasties, the family tree for the Eighteenth Dynasty is complex and unclear.

References 

 01
18
Family tree